There are at least 290 named mountain passes in Montana.
 MacDonald Pass, Lewis and Clark County, Montana, el. 
 Marias Pass, Glacier County, Montana, el. 
 Markle Pass, Sanders County, Montana, el. 
 McCormack Pass, Madison County, Montana, el. 
 Meyers Creek Pass, Sweet Grass County, Montana, el. 
 Mill Creek Pass, Park County, Montana, el. 
 Miller Saddle, Mineral County, Montana, el. 
 Milwaukee Pass, Sanders County, Montana, el. 
 Mink Creek Saddle, Ravalli County, Montana, el. 
 Minton Creek Pass, Sanders County, Montana, el. 
 Missouri Cutoff, Carbon County, Montana, el. 
 Mollman Pass, Lake County, Montana, (Salish: sɫipú sx̣ʷcusi, múlmin sx̣ʷcusi ) , el. 
 Monida Pass, Beaverhead County, Montana, el. 
 Moose Pass, Meagher County, Montana, el. 
 Morrisy Coulee Narrows, Wheatland County, Montana, el. 
 Mud Creek Saddle, Ravalli County, Montana, el. 
 Muggins Gap, Rosebud County, Montana, el. 
 Mullan Pass, Mineral County, Montana, el. 
 Mullan Pass, Powell County, Montana, el. 
 Muskrat Pass, Flathead County, Montana, el. 
 Mustard Pass, Madison County, Montana, el. 
 Nevada Narrows, Meagher County, Montana, el. 
 Nez Perce Pass, Ravalli County, Montana, el. 
 Nezperce Pass, Ravalli County, Montana, el. 
 Observation Pass, Lewis and Clark County, Montana, el. 
 Packbox Pass, Ravalli County, Montana, el. 
 Pass of the Winds, Missoula County, Montana, el. 
 Pete Creek Divide, Beaverhead County, Montana, el. 
 Piegan Pass, Glacier County, Montana, el. 
 Pintler Pass, Deer Lodge County, Montana, el. 
 Piper-Crow Pass, Lake County, Montana, el. 
 Pipestone Pass (Montana), Silver Bow County, Montana, el. 
 Pitamakan Pass, Glacier County, Montana, el. 
 Porcupine Pass, Sanders County, Montana, el. 
 Porcupine Saddle, Ravalli County, Montana, el. 
 Price-Peet Divide, Beaverhead County, Montana, el. 
 Priest Pass, Lewis and Clark County, Montana, el. 
 Pryor Gap, Big Horn County, Montana, el. 
 Pyramid Pass, Powell County, Montana, el. 
 Racetrack Pass, Granite County, Montana, el. 
 Radersburg Pass, Jefferson County, Montana, el. 
 Rainbow Lake Pass, Sanders County, Montana, el. 
 Ralston Gap, Teton County, Montana, el. 
 Raynolds Pass, Madison County, Montana, el. 
 Red Eagle Pass, Flathead County, Montana , el. 
 Red Rock Pass, Beaverhead County, Montana, el. 
 Redgap Pass, Glacier County, Montana, el. 
 Rocky Gap, Cascade County, Montana, el. 
 Rogers Pass, Lewis and Clark County, Montana, el. 
 Rooster Comb, Granite County, Montana, el. 
 Ross Pass, Fergus County, Montana, el. 
 Ross Pass, Gallatin County, Montana, el. 
 Route Creek Pass, Teton County, Montana, el. 
 S and G Saddle, Missoula County, Montana, el. 
 Saint Paul Pass, Sanders County, Montana, el. 
 Saint Paul Pass, Mineral County, Montana, el. 
 Sawmill Saddle, Granite County, Montana, el. 
 Schley Saddle, Mineral County, Montana, el. 
 Schultz Saddle, Beaverhead County, Montana, el. 
 Seemo Pass, Flathead County, Montana, el. 
 Shetland Divide, Phillips County, Montana, el. 
 Shoemaker Gap, Phillips County, Montana, el. 
 Siegel Pass, Missoula County, Montana, el. 
 Silver Butte Pass, Lincoln County, Montana, el. 
 Silver Pass, Park County, Montana, el. 
 Sioux Pass, Big Horn County, Montana, el. 
 Siyeh Pass, Glacier County, Montana, el. 
 Skalkaho Pass, Ravalli County, Montana, el. 
 Smith Creek Pass, Missoula County, Montana, el. 
 Snake Creek Pass, Sanders County, Montana, el. 
 Snowshoe Pass, Madison County, Montana, el. 
 Snuff Gap, McCone County, Montana, el. 
 Spotted Bear Pass, Lewis and Clark County, Montana, el. 
 Spuhler Saddle, Madison County, Montana, el. 
 Stag Run, Musselshell County, Montana, el. 
 Steels Pass, Madison County, Montana, el. 
 Stemple Pass, Lewis and Clark County, Montana, el. 
 Steves Pass, Missoula County, Montana, el. 
 Stoney Indian Pass, Glacier County, Montana, el. 
 Storm Lake Pass, Deer Lodge County, Montana, el. 
 Stormy Pass, Ravalli County, Montana, el. 
 Straight Creek Pass, Lewis and Clark County, Montana, el. 
 Suicide Pass, Powder River County, Montana, el. 
 Sun River Pass, Teton County, Montana, el. 
 Sundance Pass, Carbon County, Montana, el. 
 Surprise Pass, Flathead County, Montana, el. 
 Swiftcurrent Pass, Glacier County, Montana, el. 
 Switchback Pass, Flathead County, Montana, el. 
 T L Gap, Teton County, Montana, el. 
 Targhee Pass, Gallatin County, Montana, el. 
 Taylor Divide, Blaine County, Montana, el. 
 Tepee Pass, Gallatin County, Montana, el. 
 Teton Pass, Flathead County, Montana, el. 
 The Divide, Fergus County, Montana, el. 
 The Gap, Fergus County, Montana, el. 
 The Notch, Madison County, Montana, el. 
 Theodore Roosevelt Pass, Flathead County, Montana, el. 
 Therriault Pass, Lincoln County, Montana, el. 
 Thompson Pass, Sanders County, Montana, el. 
 Tom Graham Pass, Madison County, Montana, el. 
 Took Creek Saddle, Ravalli County, Montana, el. 
 Took Ridge Saddle, Ravalli County, Montana, el. 
 Tough Creek Saddle, Ravalli County, Montana, el. 
 Trenk Pass, Carter County, Montana, el. 
 Triple Divide Pass, Glacier County, Montana, el. 
 Trixie Pass, Flathead County, Montana, el. 
 Twitchell Pass, McCone County, Montana, el. 
 Two Medicine Pass, Flathead County, Montana, el. 
 Two Y Junction, Missoula County, Montana, el. 
 Vacation Pass, Lake County, Montana, el. 
 Verde Saddle, Mineral County, Montana, el. 
 Vermilion Pass, Sanders County, Montana, el. 
 Wahoo Pass, Ravalli County, Montana, el. 
 Warren Pass, Granite County, Montana, el. 
 Welch-Gillispie Saddle, Granite County, Montana, el. 
 Welcome Pass, Lewis and Clark County, Montana, el. 
 Welcome Sawmill Saddle, Granite County, Montana, el. 
 Welcome Sawmill Saddle, Granite County, Montana, el. 
 West Fork Tyler Saddle, Granite County, Montana, el. 
 White River Pass, Powell County, Montana, el. 
 Whitetail Saddle, Granite County, Montana, el. 
 Wild Horse Pass, Rosebud County, Montana, el. 
 Wild Horse Pass, McCone County, Montana, el. 
 Williams Pass, Mineral County, Montana, el. 
 Willow Creek Pass, Sanders County, Montana, el. 
 Windy Pass, Gallatin County, Montana, el. 
 Windy Pass, Powell County, Montana, el. 
 Windy Pass, Lincoln County, Montana, el. 
 Windy Pass, Madison County, Montana, el. 
 Wolverine Pass, Park County, Montana, el. 
 Woods Creek Pass, Ravalli County, Montana, el. 
 Youngs Pass, Powell County, Montana, el.

See also
 List of mountains in Montana
 List of mountain ranges in Montana

Notes

 
Mountain passes
Montana